There are several banks that operate under the name "Volksbank" (Afrikaans, Dutch and German for "people's bank").

There are also 1,099 independent local Volksbanken in Germany. They are completely separate from the Austrian Association of Volksbanks.
Volksbanken are also known as VB (Volk is the German word for people)
or as VR (Volksbanken Raiffeisenbanken).

Germany - Volksbanken Raiffeisenbanken

The "Bundesverband der Deutschen Volksbanken und Raiffeisenbanken" (Federal Association of Volksbanken and Raiffeisenbanken) is a consortium of 1,099 independent credit unions, which represents the banks as Germany's largest banking group in several marketing affairs and as service partner Genossenschaftliche Finanzgruppe Volksbanken Raiffeisenbanken - Cooperative Financial Group.

The Genossenschaftliche Finanzgruppe is the only banking group which survived the financial crisis of 2007-08 without any state intervention. Former subsidiaries of Volksbank, have been sold to Sberbank of Russia.

Companies of the Genossenschaftliche Finanzgruppe
 DZ Bank
 DG HYP - mortgage bank
 Münchener Hypothekenbank - mortgage bank
 WL BANK - Investment for banks
 Bausparkasse Schwäbisch Hall - building society
 R+V Versicherung - insurance services
 Union Investment Gruppe - asset management
 VR LEASING Gruppe - investment financing
 easyCredit - personal loans
 DZ PRIVATBANK - private banking, asset management
 VR Equitypartner - equity funding
 VR Mittelstandskapital

13 January 2013 robbery at Berliner Volksbank 
On 13 January 2013 robbers stole goods from 100 private safe deposit boxes located in Steglitz, Berlin. In the official statement the police said that bank security officer noticed smoke coming from the deposit room on Monday morning (January 14). Next they found broken deposit boxes and a 30 m tunnel, the digging of which probably took a couple of weeks or even months. The tunnel (external pictures) was reportedly so well constructed that it had ceiling supports and was about 3 feet wide. It connected the bank deposit and a nearby underground parking lot. Probably nobody noticed anything, because the parking lot was shielded by roulettes, and people thought that this part was under repair. There are some similarities between this robbery and the Baker Street robbery in London.

Austria - Association of Volksbanks

In Austria there are 35 local Volksbanks (by end of 2015), each of them organized as a cooperative or a corporation. By 2017 they will merge to 8 regional banks and 2 specialized banks. They build an integrated system of banks (Association of Volksbanks) connected through a contract of collaboration. The central institution is VOLKSBANK WIEN AG, the biggest regional bank of the association. The central service functions were transferred from Österreichische Volksbanken AG (ÖVAG) to VOLKSBANK WIEN AG in July 2015. ÖVAG itself surrendered its banking license. The "remainder of ÖVAG" continues to operate as a wind-down entity under the name of immigon portfolioabbau ag. Immigon is responsible for ensuring the orderly, active and value-preserving wind-down of its assets.

The Netherlands - De Volksbank 

De Volksbank is a Dutch retail bank offering financial products to both companies and individuals.

South Africa - Volkskas 

Volkskas Beperk was a South African bank founded in 1934 as a cooperative loan bank, becoming a commercial bank in 1941. In 1991, by which time it had become South Africa's largest Afrikaner bank, Volkskas merged with United Building Society, Allied Building Society and Trust Bank to form Amalgamated Banks of South Africa (now, Absa Group Limited).

References

External links

Volksbanken Raiffeisenbanken
Austrian Association of Volksbanks
VOLKSBANK WIEN AG
immigon portfolioabbau ag, former ÖVAG

Cooperative banks of Austria
Banks established in 1850
Cooperative banks of Germany